Ko Samui (or Koh Samui, also often locally shortened to Samui;)  is an island off the east coast of Thailand. Geographically in the Chumphon Archipelago, it is part of Surat Thani Province, though as of 2012, Ko Samui was granted municipal status and thus is now locally self-governing. In 2018, it was visited by 2.7 million tourists.

History
The island was probably first inhabited about 15 centuries ago, settled by fishermen from the Malay Peninsula and southern China. It appears on Chinese maps dating back to 1687, under the name Pulo Cornam.

The origin of the name samui is unknown. It may come from the Sanskrit-Tamil word สมวย, meaning 'sea weather'. Or it may derive from the name of a tree known locally in southern Thailand as ต้นหมุย (full name ต้นสมุย). A third possibility is that it originated from early Hainanese traders to Samui. In Hainanese Chinese, เซ่าบ่วย means 'first island', 'barrier', or 'gate', or literally 'beautiful beach'. As it was their first port of call in Thailand, it became its name and evolved over time to สมุย. Some people believe that the word "samui" derives from the Malay word saboey, or 'safe haven'. There is no firm corroboration of any of these theories. Ko is the Thai word for "island".

Until the late-20th century, Ko Samui was an isolated self-sufficient community, having little connection with the mainland of Thailand. The island was without roads until the early 1970s, and the  journey from one side of the island to the other could involve a whole-day trek through the mountainous central jungles.

Ko Samui's economy now is based primarily on a successful tourist industry, as well as exports of coconut and rubber.

Economic growth has brought not only prosperity, but also major changes to the island's environment and culture.

Governance
The first local government on Samui island was established in 1956 with the sanitary district Ko Samui, which however only covered the area around the settlement. In 1963 it was enlarged to cover the entirety of Samui and Pha-Nga islands, which at that time were still in the same district. In 1973, the area of the Ko Pha-Ngan District became a separate sanitary district. Since 1981, the sanitary district covers the area of the whole district.

Like all sanitary districts, Ko Samui became a subdistrict municipality (thesaban tambon) in 1999.
In 2008, the subdistrict municipality was upgraded to a town municipality (thesaban mueang),
and in 2012, the town was upgraded to a city municipality.

The conversion of the municipality into a special administrative area with greater powers of self-governance similar to Pattaya has been discussed since 2008, but as of 2018 no action has been taken.

Geography

It is the most significant island in the Chumphon Archipelago. To the north are the populated resort islands of Ko Pha-ngan, Ko Tao, and Ko Nang Yuan. Close to Bangrak in northeast Samui is the small uninhabited island of Ko Som, and to the northeast of Chaweng is the tiny Ko Matlang. To the south are Ko Taen and Ko Matsum, each of which have small tourist facilities. To the far west are 44 other islands which together compose Mu Ko Ang Thong National Park which is accessible by a day-trip boat tour from Ko Samui.

The various lowland and coastal areas are connected by Route 4169, which is a -long road, encircling the island. Many other concrete roads branch off from Route 4169 to service other areas.

On the west coast of the island is the original capital, Nathon, which still houses many government offices, as well as two of the island's five major piers. Nathon is the major port for fisheries and for vehicular and goods transportation from the mainland. As the site of the main port and the closest city to the mainland has made Nathon the commercial centre for Samui locals. More recently, the transition from dependence on the local coconut industry along with the continued growth and development of the tourist industry, as well as the northeastern location of the airport, has led to the increase of commercial activity in Chaweng and Bophut.

Climate
Ko Samui has a tropical monsoon climate according to the Köppen climate classification, bordering on a tropical rainforest climate. The island has a dry season month, with the average monthly precipitation in February falling below , the threshold for a tropical dry season month. The climate is warm and humid for most of the year. In comparison to Phuket and most of the rest of southern Thailand, Samui's weather is relatively drier (Samui receives about  rain per year, and Phuket gets ). Phuket's wet season is spread over six to eight months. The heaviest precipitation typically falls in the months of October and November. For the rest of the year, given the tropical climate, rain showers are brief; 20–60 minutes duration is typical.

Administration
Ko Samui is an amphoe (district) of Surat Thani Province, divided into seven sub-districts (tambons) and 39 administrative villages (mubans). The entire island is one city municipality (thesaban nakhon). The district covers the island, as well as the Ang Thong archipelago and some other small islands nearby.

Originally, the district included all of the islands of Surat Thani Province. The islands Ko Pha-ngan and Ko Tao were split off as the minor district (king amphoe) Ko Pha-ngan effective 1 October 1970. In 1980, administrative village number seven of Ang Thong Sub-district covering the islands Ko Chueak, Ko Nok Phao, and Ko Rikan was reassigned to Don Sak District, where it now forms village number 11.

Transport

Samui Airport is a private airport built and owned by Bangkok Airways, which is still the main operator and has been the only airline with services to Ko Samui from mainland Thailand since the airport's construction in 1989. Due to its use of locally produced palm leaves and a natural, open-air cooling system, the terminal complex received an Environment Impact Assessment Award under the guidance of Prasert Prasarttong-Osoth. Ko Samui airport is built in an open style, drawing connections between it and traditional Thai architecture. In 2009, the airport handled 1.3 million passengers and 17,707 aircraft operations. The airport is now additionally served by Thai Airways to Bangkok and Firefly Airlines to Kuala Lumpur and Penang.
 
Flights from Samui to Phuket and other Thai destinations are available, and in 2012, the Thai government announced the possibility of a second Ko Samui airport due to complaints of high airport fees.

Several ferries connect the island with the mainland, including two car/passenger ferries, and connect Don Sak to piers in the west of the island, in Lipa Noi and in Nathon. Public buses to all parts of the mainland operate from a new bus station north of Nathon. Privately operated songthaews circle the ring road like a bus service with fixed fees mostly only in the daytime, and private taxis which charged a fixed, flat fee depending on the destination.

Tourism

The expansion of tourism in Ko Samui has resulted in growth of building resorts, bungalows, and luxury private villas on the island. The island's total of 17,479 hotel rooms in 2013 was increased by an additional 459 new rooms in 2015. A gradual shift in demand is seeing more Asian visitors and families, but the top three source markets have been Germany, the UK, and Thailand, which contribute a combined 27 percent share. Bangkok Airways continues to modernise its fleet with new Airbuses, phasing out older ATR 72 propeller planes, which will provide 189,000 additional airline seats for Samui travelers. The airport has already increased the number of daily flights from 36 to 50.

The island received more than 2.5 million foreign visitors in 2017, up from 2.34 million in 2016. According to a luxury hotelier, tourists traveling to Ko Samui spend an average of 7,700 to 8,200 baht per head per day.

, legislators in the Thai parliament have put forward a proposal to build an  bridge linking mainland Nakhon Si Thammarat Province with Ko Samui. The MPs claim that the project would spur economic growth in south Thailand. They propose that—if built—it be named "Chan-o-cha" in honour of Prime Minister Prayut Chan-o-cha.

Environmental improvements
Ko Samui hosts some 2,700,000 visitors per year. To manage this, every resort, hotel, villa, restaurant, and facility is required to maintain their own septic tank systems so there is no need for widespread wastewater treatment. Rainwater collection from roadway run-off along Samui's main ring road has been vastly improved during the main Ring Road revitalization and improvement project begun in 2017 and nearly completed as of 2020.  The project has widened the main ring roads all the way around the entire island, upgrading with new steel-reinforced concrete along with asphalt blacktop, new sidewalks, additional street-lights, and run-off water collection.  Ko Samui has three main run-off water treatment plants, in Chaweng, Lamai, and Maenam, to handle the rainwater collection from the roads; since all sewage is handled by each property's own required septic systems.

Other islands such as Koh Tao and Koh Phangan (famous for its full moon parties) have much more serious problems due to lack of good infrastructure and enforcement. Plans to build more water treatment plants on those other island has been stymied by lack of funding, making Koh Samui's better infrastructure much more appealing.

Events and festivals
Buffalo Fighting Festival: One of the best-known festivals on Ko Samui is the Buffalo Fighting Festival which is held on special occasions such as New Year's Day and Songkran. Unlike Spanish bullfighting, the fighting on Ko Samui is fairly harmless. The fighting season varies according to some ancient customs and ceremonies. The buffalo are decorated with ribbons and gold-painted leaves. Before the contest, which lasts just two rounds, monks spray the buffalos with holy water.  Gambling is often part of these events, though Gambling in Thailand is illegal. 
Samui Regatta: The Samui Regatta is a sailing tournament held every year. The tournament is internationally known and competitors come from as far away as Australia, Singapore, Japan, and China. The event began in 2002.
Ten Stars Samui Art Party: A recurring cultural event bringing together art lovers, local Thai and international artists, and their artwork. The annual event, hosted at various resorts and other venues, focus on building the art community on Ko Samui, with presentations by featured artists.
Samui Triathlon: The International Triathlon Union organizes this event every year. This event draws more than five hundred participants from around the world.
Koh Samui THA Midnight Run: The Koh Samui Midnight Run is a charity run organized by the Thai Hotel Association (THA) and the Thai Association of Ko Samui (TAKS). It is a yearly event usually held in March. With up to 2,000 participants, the run is one of the biggest on Samui and in Thailand. Participants run 5 km or 10 km around the streets of Chaweng Beach. The first run was held in 2013.
 The Koh Samui (Anniversary) Festival is held every year around the second week of September, usually in the port city of Nathon as well as in Chaweng. It includes many events such as concerts, craft fairs, Thai cultural exhibitions and a huge, free buffet set up along the island's longest beach; so big in fact, that the festival's free dinner table offering earned a Guinness World Record for largest buffet ever served, on September 12. 2017.  It stretched 2.5 kilometres along Chaweng Beach on Samui.  The five-day festival occurs ever year but was initially founded to commemorate the 120th anniversary of the island’s founding in 1897.
Koh Samui International Podcast Festival: The International Podcast Festival is held on Chaweng beach  with the 2018 festival drawing a mainly international audience of several hundred people. Multiple podcasts featured, including Australian Logie award winner Dilruk Jayasinha hosting an episode of The Dollop.

Medical care
Samui has four private hospitals: Samui International Hospital; Thai International; Bandon Hospital; and Bangkok Hospital Samui. The government hospital is in Nathon.

See also
List of islands of Thailand

References

Gallery

External links

Samui
Ko Samui
Ko Samui
Islands of the Gulf of Thailand